DP Leonis b is an extrasolar planet, orbiting the 17th magnitude star DP Leonis, constellation Leo. This 6.28 MJ planet orbits two stars, a white dwarf and a red dwarf, at a separation of about 8.6 AU with unknown eccentricity.

References 

Exoplanets discovered in 2009
Exoplanets detected by timing
Giant planets
Leo (constellation)
Circumbinary planets